The 2nd Fußball-Bundesliga (women) 2004–05 was the 1st season of the 2. Fußball-Bundesliga (women), Germany's second football league. It began on 5 September 2004 and ended on 22 May 2005.

Group North

Final standings 

Pld = Matches played; W = Matches won; D = Matches drawn; L = Matches lost; GF = Goals for; GA = Goals against; GD = Goal difference; Pts = Points

Group South

Final standings 

Pld = Matches played; W = Matches won; D = Matches drawn; L = Matches lost; GF = Goals for; GA = Goals against; GD = Goal difference; Pts = Points

References 

2004-05
Ger
2
Women2